Walnut Grove, Arkansas may refer to:
   
Walnut Grove, Clay County, Arkansas, a place in Arkansas
Walnut Grove, Columbia County, Arkansas, a place in Arkansas
Walnut Grove, Independence County, Arkansas, a place in Arkansas
Walnut Grove, Little River County, Arkansas, a place in Arkansas
Walnut Grove, Poinsett County, Arkansas, a place in Arkansas
Walnut Grove, Pope County, Arkansas
Walnut Grove, Van Buren County, Arkansas, a community in Van Buren County, Arkansas
Walnut Grove, Washington County, Arkansas
Walnut Grove, Yell County, Arkansas, a place in Arkansas

See also
Walnut Grove Corner, Arkansas, a place in Arkansas
Walnut Grove (disambiguation)